Dangerous Cargo is a 1954 British crime film directed by John Harlow starring Jack Watling, Susan Stephen and Karel Stepanek. The film was produced by Stanley Haynes for ACT Films. British crime reporter Percy Hoskins provided the story. It was shot at Walton Studios near London with sets designed by the art director Don Russell. It was made as a second feature.

Plot
Tim Matthews (Watling) works at London Airport. He is tricked by Harry (Alexander), a wartime friend into revealing the details of a gold shipment.

Cast
 Jack Watling as Tim Matthews
 Susan Stephen as Janie Matthews
 Karel Stepanek as Pliny
 Richard Pearson as Noel
 Terence Alexander as Harry
 John Le Mesurier as Luigi
 Ballard Berkeley as Findley
 Genine Graham as Diana
 John Longden as Worthington
 Trevor Reid as Watson
 Arthur Rigby as Feathers
 John H. Watson as Tomkins
 Arthur Mullard as Thug

References

Bibliography
 Chibnall, Steve & McFarlane, Brian. The British 'B' Film. Palgrave MacMillan, 2009.

External links

1954 films
1954 crime films
British crime films
Films directed by John Harlow
Films set in London
Films shot at Nettlefold Studios
1950s English-language films
British black-and-white films
1950s British films